The Billboard Music Award for Chart Achievement winners. This is one of three fan voted categories in the award show. Drake is the most nominations artist, he has been nominated 3 times (2016, 2018 and 2019). Taylor Swift (2015, 2020) and The Weeknd (2016, 2017) received two nominations.

Winners and nominees

References

Billboard awards